KVNI (1080 kHz) is a commercial AM radio station licensed to Coeur d'Alene, Idaho, serving the Spokane metropolitan area of Eastern Washington and Northern Idaho.  It is owned by Morgan Murphy Media, with the license held by QueenB Radio, Inc. Morgan Murphy owns seven radio stations and a TV station in the Spokane area.

KVNI airs a classic hits radio format, which is also carried on an FM translator station, K223AN.  The two stations call themselves "92.5 Classic Hits", referring to the translator's dial position at 92.5 MHz.

KVNI studios are at the QueenB Radio offices on West Boone Avenue in Spokane, Washington.  The transmitter is located several miles southeast of Coeur d'Alene.  The station is powered at 10,000 watts, using a non-directional antenna by day.  But because AM 1080 is a clear-channel frequency, reserved for Class A stations KRLD in Dallas and WTIC in Hartford, Connecticut, KVNI reduces power at night to 1000 watts directional to avoid interference.

History
KVNI first signed on the air in 1948.  It originally broadcast on AM 1240 running 250 watts. In 1980, it moved to AM 1080, increasing its daytime power to 10,000 watts and nighttime power to 1000 watts. In the station's early years, it aired a full-service–MOR format. In 1986, it switched to a Soft AC format, with programming from the Satellite Music Network. In February 1999, the station switched to a talk/sports format, as a partial simulcast of KXLY. In November 1999, it adopted a country format, with programming from Westwood One.

In October 2001, the station adopted an oldies format. It was branded "The Mighty 1080" with the slogan "Doo-Woppin' Oldies". In September 2011, the station switched to a sports format as an affiliate of ESPN Radio. On November 20, 2015 KVNI dropped its all-sports format and began playing Christmas music, branded as "92.5 Kootenai FM."  On December 26, 2016, the station began airing an adult contemporary format.  Less than a year later the format was adjusted to 90's based adult hits.

On October 4, 2021, KVNI changed their format from 90's based adult hits to classic hits, branded as "92.5 Classic Hits".

Previous logo

References

External links

Morgan Murphy Media stations
VNI
Radio stations established in 1948
1948 establishments in Idaho
Classic hits radio stations in the United States